"Step by Step" is a song recorded by Whitney Houston, originally written and recorded by Annie Lennox. The song appeared on the B-side to Lennox's 1992 single "Precious". Whitney Houston released a reworked crossover R&B/pop cover version in 1996 on the album The Preacher's Wife. Houston's version replaces Lennox's verses with new lyrics and omits portions of the bridge. Annie Lennox provides backing vocals for Houston's rendition.

Background
In an interview for The Nation, Houston said that "Annie sent me this really beautiful, spiritual song and it fit the groove of the album right away".

Critical reception
J. D. Considine of The Baltimore Sun described "Step by Step" as "a slick, synth-driven number that recalls the '80s-style sparkle of her early hits", and "certain to spend many weeks in the Top 10". Larry Flick from Billboard named it "one of the shining moments" on The Preacher's Wife soundtrack. He also called it "a rousing, gospel-kissed chugger", adding that "[i]t's been too long since Houston has cut loose on an uptempo number, and she whips through this jam with engaging ease". In its review for the dance single for "Step By Step", the magazine deemed it as an "uplifting anthem", in which "Houston cuts loose with stirring gospel fervor". Chris Willman from Entertainment Weekly said in his soundtrack review, "Best among the non-gospel fare, [...] [is] Step by Step, a house throbber penned by Annie Lennox, represents an admirable departure but gets tripped up by a pallid Inspirations R Us lyric and perhaps too much of its author's stamp." 

Howard Cohen from the Miami Herald described it as a "punchy dance/pop number", adding that its "bass-rumbling remix seems a natural for clubs". A reviewer from Music Week rated it five out of five, writing, "Tight production, a strong pop song written by Annie Lennox and a thumping groove all single this out as a smash hit for the Christmas party market. It's Houston's best work for ages." While reviewing The Preacher's Wife album, Cary Darling of the Orange County Register said that Houston "turns in a credible, danceable take" on the Lennox song, adding that the Teddy Riley remix "digs a deep new jack groove." Bob Waliszewski of Plugged In called it "aerobically upbeat", noting that the song "embraces the challenges of living day by day".

Following Houston's death in 2012, Entertainment Weekly published a list of her 25 best songs and ranked "Step by Step" number 13, explaining, "The Preacher's Wife wasn't a masterpiece, but for gospel lovers, its soundtrack was [...] [a]nd its Annie Lennox-penned second single – an ode to not biting off more than you can chew, set to a churchy dance beat – peaked at a respectable No. 15 on the pop charts." It was placed at number five on Idolators list of "Whitney Houston’s 10 Best Songs That Radio Forgot" because the song "teaches us that we can overcome any obstacle". BET placed it at number 22 in their list of "The 40 Best Whitney Houston Songs", adding that "she ably recalls her '80s uptempo prime with a result that's both spirit- and body-moving".

Chart performance
After its release, "Step by Step" reached number 15 on the Billboard Hot 100 singles chart in the US. Houston's single charted successfully across the globe, reaching the Top 20 in over 45 countries. It was certified Gold by the Recording Industry Association of America. It was also successful in Europe and peaked within the top ten in Austria, the Czech Republic, Denmark, Germany, Hungary, Scotland and Spain. And it also peaked at number ten on the composite European Hot 100. In the United Kingdom, the song was released in late 1996 as the first single from The Preacher's Wife soundtrack. It peaked at number thirteen and was certified silver by the British Phonographic Industry. In February 2012, after Houston's passing, it re-entered the UK singles chart at number 83. As of 2012, the song had sold 235,000 copies in the United Kingdom. In Australia, it peaked at number 12 and spent 15 weeks on the chart. It was certified gold by the Australian Recording Industry Association. In Austria it peaked at number six and spent 16 weeks on the chart.

Music video
A music video was produced to promote the single, directed by American film director, screenwriter, and music video director Paul Hunter. It shows mainly Houston wearing a brown raincoat and dancing to the song on a center stage while other dancers join her as the song develops. Houston's footages are intercut with scenes of a youth center, being restored by youngsters after a fire. The video  for "Step by Step" was later published on Houston's official YouTube channel in October 2009. It has amassed more than 48 million views as of January 2023.

Live performances
After its release, "Step by Step" has been performed on all of Houston's tours: Pacific Rim Tour (1997), The European Tour (1998), My Love Is Your Love World Tour (1999), Soul Divas Tour (2004) and Nothing but Love World Tour (2009–2010). It was also performed in her HBO special Classic Whitney Live from Washington, D.C. in 1997.

Track listings and formats
CD single
"Step by Step" (Album Version) – 4:12
"Step by Step" (Teddy Riley Remix) – 4:32

CD maxi single
"Step by Step" (Tony Moran Remix) – 10:22
"Step by Step" (Junior's Arena Anthem Mix) – 11:50
"Step by Step" (Soul Solution Diva Vocal) – 8:47
"Step by Step" (K-Klass Remix) – 10:08
"Step by Step" (Teddy Riley Remix) – 5:00
"Step by Step" (Album Version) – 4:07

12" – The Remixes (Europe)
"Step by Step" (Junior's Arena Anthem Mix) – 11:50
"Step by Step" (Album Version) – 4:12
"Step by Step" (K-Klass Remix) – 10:06
"Step by Step" (Soul Solution Bonus Bass Dub) – 2:40
"Step by Step" (Soul Solution Diva Vocal) – 9:02
"Step by Step" (Junior's Deep Vocal Mix) – 8:47
"Step by Step" (Teddy Riley Remix) – 4:32

Personnel

Credits
Producer, mixer – Stephen Lipson
Writer – Annie Lennox
Vocal arrangement – Whitney Houston
Recording engineer – Heff Moraes

Recording and mixing
Recorded at the Aquarium Studio, London, UK and Crossway Studios, Mendham, NJ
Mixed at the Aquarium Studio, London, UK

Charts and certifications

Weekly charts

Year-end charts

Certifications

References

External links
Step By Step at Discogs

1992 songs
1996 singles
1997 singles
Annie Lennox songs
Whitney Houston songs
Dance-pop songs
House music songs
Music videos directed by Paul Hunter (director)
Songs written by Annie Lennox
Song recordings produced by Stephen Lipson
Gospel songs